Cotton End is a small village and civil parish on the outskirts of Bedford. It became its own parish as of 1 April 2019, having previously been part of the parish of Eastcotts. Ordnance Survey maps from the 1880s show its name as 'Cardington Cotton End'.

There is a primary school, a Baptist church, a village hall and a pub.

The Baptist chapel was founded here in 1777. 
In 1912, Cotton End was described as a scattered hamlet with a school and a farm. It lies further down the A600 road from Shortstown.

A new woodland created by the Forest of Marston Vale in 2005 called Shocott Spring.

References

External links

Villages in Bedfordshire
Civil parishes in Bedfordshire
Borough of Bedford
Populated places established in 2019
2019 establishments in England